Ivaylo Stoyanov (born 13 July 1990) is a Bulgarian footballer who plays as a midfielder for Strumska Slava.

Career
Stoyanov left Strumska Slava Radomir at the end of the 2017–18 season, having made 115 appearances for the club.

On 2 July 2018, Stoyanov signed a one-year contract with Montana, following a successful trial period.

Career statistics

References

External links

1990 births
Living people
People from Pernik
Bulgarian footballers
First Professional Football League (Bulgaria) players
Second Professional Football League (Bulgaria) players
PFC Minyor Pernik players
FC Strumska Slava Radomir players
FC Montana players
FC Chavdar Etropole players
Association football midfielders